Northview High School is located in Plainfield Township, Kent County, Michigan, a Northeastern suburb of Grand Rapids, Michigan. It was a National Blue Ribbon school in 2001. The high school is one of the two high schools in the Northview Public Schools system.

History
The Northview Public School District was born in the late 1950s. As the population of greater Grand Rapids swelled, the need for a high school became clear, and in an effort to pool the financial resources needed to build a high school, several small rural school districts merged with the Oakview Public School District to form Northview Public Schools. In 1959, construction began on the building, and in 1962, Northview High School opened its doors to its first students. In 2011 and 2012, two tax proposals gave over 43.5 million dollars towards renovating the high school campus, as well as the athletic facilities. In the early fall of 2014, the construction was completed.

Athletics
The Northview Wildcats are in the Ottawa-Kent Conference White Division. Northview's athletic teams compete under the "Wildcat" mascot.

Notable alumni
Gary Hogeboom - NFL Quarterback
Stacy Haiduk - actor
Carter Smith - Outside Linebacker

References

Public high schools in Michigan
Educational institutions established in 1960
Schools in Kent County, Michigan